Peggy Gordon is an American singer-songwriter best known for her role as Peggy in the original 1971 Off-Broadway cast of Godspell.

Gordon wrote the music to “By My Side” with fellow CMU student Jay Hamburger writing the lyrics. It was the only song that survived the re-scoring of the show by Stephen Schwartz. She sang this song in the musical production, with Gilmer McCormick providing harmonic vocals.

References

External links

Possibly living people
Year of birth missing
American musical theatre actresses